Nebo hierichonticus, the common black scorpion, is a species of scorpion in the family Diplocentridae.

Description
N. hierichonticus can reach a length of 14 cm (5.5 in). Its basic color ranges from a light brown or reddish-brown to dark brown. Its legs are yellowish. It has a thin metasoma and large pedipalps and chelae. The base of the sting (vesicle) is oval, with a quite short sting (telson). Venom of this species is quite toxic, causing hemorrhage and necrosis, but the effects of the sting on humans is almost negligible, without any long-term effects.

Distribution and habitat
This species occurs in the Middle East (Lebanon, Syria, Jordan, Israel / Palestine) and in Egypt in the Sinai Peninsula. It lives under the rocks and in self-dug deep caves in the deserts and in arid to semiarid mountainous regions.

References

 Biolib
 Skorpion.info.de
 Arachnoboards

Diplocentridae
Animals described in 1872
Fauna of the Middle East